Homer Martin may refer to:

 Homer Martin (labor leader) (1901–1968), American trade unionist and socialist
 Homer Dodge Martin (1836–1897), American artist
 Homer C. Martin, American college football head coach (1923-1926, 1936)